Lütä is a village in Setomaa Parish, Võru County, in southeastern Estonia, by the Estonia–Russia border. The Luhamaa border crossing on the Estonian national road 7 (part of Riga–Pskov highway, E77) is located in Lütä village.

As of 2011 Census, the settlement's population was 5.

References

Villages in Võru County